Elections for the Shura Council were held in Egypt on 1 and 8 June 2010. From a total of 264 seats in the upper house of the Egyptian parliament, 88 are up for election every three years, another 44 are appointed by the president.

Campaign
Out of 446 candidates for elections, 115 were from political parties and 331 were independents.

Conduct

The election was not under any national court or international supervision. The General Secretary of the Policy Committee in the National Democratic Party Gamal Mubarak said in a press conference that, "This issue is governed by the law and the constitution which made it possible for civil society organizations to monitor the elections". The Secretary of Education in the NDP, Mohamed Kamal, said that the party welcomes the supervision of national organizations, but refuses international monitoring. He also added that the abolition of judicial supervision of elections does not affect the integrity of the elections.

Results

References

External links
Shura Council Election from Egypt State Information Service(ESIS)
Egypt Elections 2010 collected coverage at Ahram Online

Elections in Egypt
Egypt
Shura Council
Shura Council
Egypt
Election and referendum articles with incomplete results